Joseph Fabre (1824–1892) was the second Superior General of the Oblates of Mary Immaculate.

References

1824 births
1892 deaths
French Roman Catholic missionaries
19th-century French Roman Catholic priests
Missionary Oblates of Mary Immaculate